The Escape is a 1926 American silent Western film directed by Milburn Morante and starring Pete Morrison, Barbara Starr and Frank Norcross.

Cast
 Pete Morrison as Johnny Bowers 
 Barbara Starr as Evelyn Grant 
 Frank Norcross as Jeremiah Grant 
 Bruce Gordon as Howard Breen 
 Elmer Dewey as Silas Peele 
 Jane Arden as Flossie Lane 
 Tex Young as Manuel Estrada

References

External links
 

1926 films
1926 Western (genre) films
Universal Pictures films
Films directed by Milburn Morante
American black-and-white films
Silent American Western (genre) films
1920s English-language films
1920s American films